Maharani cave is a phosphate mining cave located at Paciran, a district of Lamongan, Indonesia.

External links
 Maharani cave

Caves of Indonesia